The 2004–05 IIHF European Women's Champions Cup was the first tournament held for the IIHF European Women's Champions Cup. AIK Hockey Dam of Sweden's Riksserien won the tournament for the first time.

Qualification
The qualification round was played during 15–17 October 2004. The winner of each group moved on to the Finals.

Group A
Host City: Ventspils, Latvia

Group B
Host City: Bolzano, Italy

Finals
The tournament finals were held 16–18 December 2004. The round was hosted in Solna, Sweden.

Best Players Selected by the Directorate

References

Tournament statistics and data from:
 Coupe d'Europe féminine des clubs champions 2004/05. hockeyarchives.info (in French). Retrieved 2020-03-25.

Women
2004
Euro